Morning Express may refer to

  Morning Express (Singaporean TV current affairs series), a Singaporean morning television news that airs on MediaCorp Channel 8
 Morning Express (Singaporean TV drama series), a 1995 Singaporean drama television series
 Morning Express with Robin Meade, an American morning television news program that airs on the HLN television network
 Tokyo Morning Express, a Japanese business news program that aired on Nikkei CNBC